Newmans Coach Lines was an Australian coach charter company with operations in Sydney and Cairns.

History
In 1987, the Sydney coach operations of Chester Coaches were purchased by New Zealand-based Newmans Coach Lines. Newmans also purchased the Cairns business of Carah Coaches.

In late 1989, Newmans commenced operating services from Sydney to Melbourne and Brisbane under the Scenic Intercapital brand. Rather than operating as express services like other coach operators, the services operated with overnight stops in Albury and Coffs Harbour. These ceased in 1990.

In 1990, Newmans commenced operating coaches for Contiki Tours following the demise of Deluxe Coachlines. In 1992, the inbound tour business was sold to Australian Pacific Tours and the Great Sights business to Manly Bus Service. Newmans ceased trading in February 1993.

Fleet
When operations ceased, the fleet consisted of 21 coaches.

Depots
Newmans was initially based in Chester Hill. In July 1988, it relocated to Arncliffe.

References

Bus companies of Australia
Transport companies established in 1987
Australian companies established in 1987
Australian companies disestablished in 1993
Transport companies disestablished in 1993